Trabrennbahn (Trotting Course) is a rapid transit station located in the Hamburg quarter of Farmsen-Berne, Germany. The station was opened in 1924 and is served by Hamburg U-Bahn line U1.

History
The station was constructed from 1912 to 1914, but opened only on 30 March 1924 as a request stop on the Walddörfer railway line, as a horse race took place on the nearby race track of Trabrennbahn Farmsen. The population was sparse in the vicinity, so the stop was not needed during the first years except for horse riding events. For the latter use, in 1931, a train reversing facility with four siding tracks was built. Since 1 October 1933 the station was serviced constantly.

The reversing facility was later reduced to two tracks and dismantled in 1971, as there were less horse races. The course of Trabrennbahn Farmsen was closed in the 1980s. The station was fully renovated in 2001, and a lift was added then. There were plans to rename it to Traberweg but the name was kept because the compound of former Trabrennbahn, re-developed as a residential area, was considered as a benchmark in the area.

Service

Trains  
Trabrennbahn is served by Hamburg U-Bahn line U1; departures are every 5 minutes. The travel time to Hamburg Hauptbahnhof takes about 18 minutes.

See also 

 List of Hamburg U-Bahn stations

References

External links 

 Line and route network plans at hvv.de 

Hamburg U-Bahn stations in Hamburg
Buildings and structures in Wandsbek
Infrastructure completed in 1914
U1 (Hamburg U-Bahn) stations
Railway stations in Germany opened in 1924